Huehuetenango is one of the 22 departments of Guatemala. It is situated in the western highlands and shares borders with the Mexican state of Chiapas in the north and west; with El Quiché in the east, with Totonicapán, Quetzaltenango and San Marcos to the south. The capital is the city of Huehuetenango.

Huehuetenango's ethnic composition is one of the most diverse in Guatemala. While the Mam are predominant in the department, other Maya groups are the Q'anjob'al, Chuj, Jakaltek, Tektik, Awakatek, Chalchitek, Akatek and K'iche'. Each of these nine Maya ethnic groups speaks its own language.

Name
The department of Huehuetenango takes its name from the city of the same name which serves as the departmental capital. The name is derived from the Nahuatl language of central Mexico, given by the indigenous allies of the Spanish conquistadors during the Spanish Conquest of Guatemala. It is usually said to mean "place of the elders" but may be a corruption of "place of the ahuehuete trees".

Geography

On the east side it is bordered by the department of El Quiché and on the south by the departments of Totonicapán, Quetzaltenango and San Marcos.

The department possesses various rivers that flow into the Chixoy River, also known as the Río Negro, which flows into the system of rivers forming the drainage basin of the Usumacinta River, which empties into the Gulf of Mexico. The most important tributaries of the Chixoy in Huehuetenango are the Hondo and Xecunabaj rivers, which flow into the department from the neighbouring departments of El Quiché and Totonicapán.

The Cuilco River enters the department from neighbouring San Marcos and crosses into the Mexican state of Chiapas, where it joins with the Grijalva River, which empties into the Gulf of Mexico. Its most important tributaries in Huehuetenango are the Apal, Chomá and Coxtón rivers.

The Ixcán River has its source near Santa Cruz Barillas and flows northwards towards Mexico where it joins the Lacuntún River, a tributary of the Usumacinta.

The Nentón River is formed in the municipality of San Sebastián Coatán by the joining of the rivers Nupxuptenam and Jajaniguán. It flows westwards across the border into Mexico where it empties into the Presa de la Angostura reservoir.

The Selegua River has its source in the Sierra de los Cuchumatanes and flows northwards, crossing the border into Chiapas, where it joins the Cuilco River to form the Grijalva River, to flow onwards to the Gulf of Mexico. Its principal tributaries are the Pino, Sibilá, Ocubilá, Naranjo, Colorado, Torlón, Mapá and Chicol rivers.

The largest body of standing water in the department is Laguna Yolnabaj, in the extreme north, close to the border with Mexico. Smaller lakes include Laguna Maxbal, Laguna Yolhuitz,  and Laguna Seca, all in the northeast of the department.

Population

In 2018 the department was recorded as having 1,170,669 inhabitants. Over 70% of the population are calculated to be living in poverty, with 22% living in extreme poverty and being unable to meet basic necessities. The majority of the population (variously estimated at 64–75%)  belongs to indigenous Maya groups with the remainder being Spanish-speaking Ladinos. The Ladinos tend to be concentrated in towns and villages including Huehuetenango, Cuilco, Chiantla, Malacatancito, La Libertad, San Antonio Huista and La Democracia, which have a relatively low indigenous population. In the rest of the department, the Maya groups make up the majority of the population as much in the towns as the countryside. Huehuetenango has the greatest number of Mam Maya in Guatemala, although there are also Mam speakers in the departments of Quetzaltenango and San Marcos, and in the Mexican state of Chiapas.

In 2008, 58% of the population of the department was aged 19 years or under.

History

Early history

The area was occupied by the Maya civilization since at least the Mesoamerican Early Classic Period. At the time of the Spanish Conquest, the Maya city of Zaculeu was the initial focus of Spanish attention in the region that would later become the department of Huehuetenango. The city was defended by the Mam king Kayb'il B'alam; it was attacked by Gonzalo de Alvarado y Chávez, cousin of Conquistador Pedro de Alvarado, in 1525. After a siege lasting several months the Mam were reduced to starvation and Kayb'il B'alam finally surrendered the city to the Spanish.

Four years after the Spanish conquest of Huehuetenango, in 1529, San Mateo Ixtatán, Santa Eulalia and Jacaltenango were given in encomienda to the conquistador Gonzalo de Ovalle, a companion of Pedro de Alvarado. In 1684, a council led by Enrique Enriquez de Guzmán, the then governor of Guatemala, decided upon the reduction of San Mateo Ixtatán and nearby Santa Eulalia, both within the colonial administrative district of the Corregimiento of Huehuetenango.

On 2 February 1838, Huehuetenango joined with Quetzaltenango, El Quiché, Retalhuleu, San Marcos and Totonicapán to form the short-lived Central American state of Los Altos. The state was crushed in 1840 by general Rafael Carrera Turcios, at that time between periods in office as Guatemalan president.

Huehuetenango includes pre-Columbian Maya archaeological sites at Zaculeu, Chalchitán, Mojá and San Mateo Ixtatán.

Departmental history
The department of Huehuetenango was created by the presidential decree of Vicente Cerna Sandoval on 8 May 1866, although various attempts had been made to declare the district a department from 1826 onwards in order to better administer it.

By 1883, Huehuetenango had 248 coffee plantations and produced 7334 quintals (Imperial hundredweight) of coffee.

In 1887, a rebellion in Huehuetenango was put down by president Manuel Lisandro Barillas, who then suspended the constitutional guarantees of the department and rewrote its constitution.

Economy and agriculture

During the 17th and 18th centuries, during the Spanish Colonial period, the main industries were mining and livestock production, run by Spaniards. In modern times agriculture is the most important industry, although mining continues on a small scale and handicraft production also contributes to the local economy. Maize is cultivated across the whole department, without being limited by local climatic differences.  The primary highland crops are wheat, potatoes, barley, alfalfa and beans. On the warmer lower slopes the primary crops are coffee, sugarcane, tobacco, chili, yuca, achiote and a wide range of fruits.

Although historically cattle and horse farming was important, the size of production is much reduced in modern times, with the rearing of sheep now more widespread. Mines in Huehuetenango produce silver, lead, zinc and copper. Gold was once mined in the department but it is no longer extracted. In 2000, the private mining company Minas de Guatemala S.A. was extracting antimony from underground mines near San Ildefonso Ixtahuacán.

Local handicraft production mainly consists of weaving traditional Maya textiles, mostly cotton but also wool, depending on the local climate.

In 2008 the most important product for exportation was coffee.

Municipalities 
The department of Huehuetenango includes 31 municipalities:

People of note
Former president of Guatemala Efraín Ríos Montt was born in Huehuetenango city on 16 June 1926.

Tourism

The main tourist attractions in the department include the source of the San Juan River and the restored Maya ruins of Zaculeu. The town of Chiantla is a centre for religious tourism, with the Catholic Church being a pilgrimage destination due to its image of the Virgin of Candelaria, known locally as Nuestra Señora de Chiantla ("Our Lady of Chiantla").

Notes

References

External links
Información y Noticias de Huehuetenango. 
 Interactive department map 
Estrategia de reducción de la pobreza - Huehuetenango 
Huehuetenango General Information

 
Departments of Guatemala